Sebastijan Pečjak (27 July 1976–6 July 2012) was a Slovenian darts player who was most notable for representing Slovenia at the 2010 PDC World Cup of Darts along with teammate Osmann Kijamet. They lost to Sweden in the first round.

Pečjak won the Soft Tip Bullshooter World Championship in 2009. In the same year, he reached the last 32 of the German Darts Championship.

Pečjak died on 6 July 2012, after a motorcycle accident in Ljubljana.

References

External links

2012 deaths
Slovenian darts players
Road incident deaths in Slovenia
Motorcycle road incident deaths
Sportspeople from Ljubljana
Professional Darts Corporation associate players
1976 births
PDC World Cup of Darts Slovenian team